The men's sanda 65 kilograms at the 1998 Asian Games in Bangkok, Thailand was held from 16 to 19 December at the Thammasat Gymnasium 6.

Sanda, formerly knows as Sanshou is the official Chinese full contact combat sport. Sanda (Sanshou) is a fighting system which was originally developed by the Chinese military based upon the study and practices of traditional Kung fu and modern combat fighting techniques.

9 men from 9 countries competed in this event, limited to fighters whose body weight was less than 65 kilograms.

You Bangmeng from China won the gold medal after beating You Bangmeng of Chinese Taipei in gold medal bout 2–0, The bronze medal was shared by Trần Đức Trang and Dias Zhamash.

Schedule
All times are Indochina Time (UTC+07:00)

Results

References

External links
Official website

Wushu at the 1998 Asian Games